Markus Sehr (born 7 April 1977) is a German film director. He directed more than eight films since 2004.

Selected filmography

References

External links 

1977 births
Living people
Mass media people from North Rhine-Westphalia
Film people from Cologne